Kahnuj-e Moezabad (also Romanized as Kahnūj-e Mo‘ezābād and Kahnoojé Mo‘ez Abad) is a village in Moezziyeh Rural District, Chatrud District, Kerman County, Kerman Province, Iran. At the 2006 census, its population was 199, in 49 families.

References 

Populated places in Kerman County